Misumessus is a genus of North American and Caribbean crab spiders first described by Nathan Banks in 1904. They look similar to members of Misumena, but are much spinier. It was considered a monotypic genus until 2017, but its taxonomic standing has been debated throughout the 20th century, first as a synonym of Misumenops, then later as its subgenus. It was raised to genus status in 2008, but has still been confused with similar genera, some of which were only known by character descriptions made by Eugène Simon nearly fifty years earlier.

Species 
 it contains seven species:
Misumessus bishopae Edwards, 2017 – Puerto Rico, Dominica, Grenadines
Misumessus blackwalli Edwards, 2017 – Bermuda
Misumessus dicaprioi Edwards, 2017 – USA
Misumessus lappi Edwards, 2017 – USA
Misumessus oblongus (Keyserling, 1880) – Canada, USA
Misumessus quinteroi Edwards, 2017 – Central America, Caribbean
Misumessus tamiami Edwards, 2017 – USA

References

Thomisidae
Monotypic Araneomorphae genera
Spiders of North America
Spiders of Central America